The hooktooth shark (Chaenogaleus macrostoma), is a weasel shark of the family Hemigaleidae, the only extant member of the genus Chaenogaleus, but there is an extinct species, Chaenogaleus affinis.  The hooktooth shark is found in the tropical Indo-West Pacific oceans between latitudes 30° N and 10° S, including the Persian Gulf, Pakistan, India, Sri Lanka, Singapore, Thailand, Viet Nam, China, Taiwan, and Java and Sulawesi in Indonesia, from the surface to a depth of 59 meters. It can reach a length of 1 meter. It is considered a vulnerable species.

See also

 List of prehistoric cartilaginous fish genera

References

 

Chaenogaleus
Marine fauna of South Asia
Marine fauna of Southeast Asia
Aquitanian genus first appearances
Extant Miocene first appearances
hooktooth shark